Arghandab may refer to:
 Arghandab District, Kandahar of Afghanistan.
 Arghandab, Afghanistan, a town in the center of Arghandab District, Kandahar.
 Arghandab District, Zabul of Afghanistan.
 Arghandab River of Afghanistan.